HMS Vengeance was a 74-gun third rate ship of the line of the Royal Navy, launched on 25 June 1774 at Rotherhithe. By 1780, she was at the island of Martinique, and was driven ashore and damaged at Saint Lucia in the Great Hurricane of 1780 but recovered and made her way to Portsmouth to be repaired. Finished in 1803, the ship was put into reserve before becoming a prison ship in the year 1808.

She was broken up in 1816.

Citations and notes

References

Lavery, Brian (2003) The Ship of the Line - Volume 1: The development of the battlefleet 1650-1850. Conway Maritime Press. .

Ships of the line of the Royal Navy
Royal Oak-class ships of the line
1774 ships
Prison ships